Siah Estalakh or Siah Estalkh or Siyah Estalkh or Siah Astalakh may refer to:
 Siah Estalakh, Rasht
 Siah Estalakh-e Mirza Rabi, Rasht County
 Siah Estalakh-e Saqad ol Molk, Rasht County
 Siah Estalkh, Sowme'eh Sara